Bill Wood may refer to:

 Bill Wood (American football) (1894–1966), American football player and coach, head football coach at Gettysburg College and Wesleyan University
 Bill Wood (Australian footballer) (1921–1989), Australian rules footballer 
 Bill Wood (footballer, born 1927), English footballer
 Bill Wood (politician) (born 1935), Australian politician
 Bill Wood (baseball) (born 1941), baseball scout

See also
 William Wood (disambiguation)